The Zane Grey Cabin near Rogue River in Oregon is a cabin built in 1926 by Zane Grey (1872–1939), the master author of the American West.  Grey used it as a frequent retreat until 1935.

It is located in Curry County, Oregon on the north bank of the lower Rogue River near Galice in Josephine County, Oregon.

The National Register announcement of listing for the Zane Grey Cabin incorrectly states that it is located in Josephine County. The cabin is in fact in Curry County.

Zane Grey also had a cabin under the Mogollon Rim near Payson, Arizona.  There is a replica of that cabin at the Rim Country Museum.

See also
Zane Grey Estate, NRHP-listed in Altadena, California
Zane Grey Museum

References

National Register of Historic Places in Curry County, Oregon
Rustic architecture
Log cabins